Henry Norman (12 December 1801 – 28 December 1867) was an English cricketer with amateur status. He was associated with Kent and Marylebone Cricket Club (MCC) and made his first-class debut in 1827. He played for the Gentlemen against the Players.

References

1801 births
1867 deaths
English cricketers
English cricketers of 1826 to 1863
Gentlemen cricketers
Kent cricketers
Marylebone Cricket Club cricketers
Gentlemen of Kent cricketers